Bardaleh is a village in Sornabad Rural District, Hamaijan District, Sepidan County, Fars Province, Iran. At the 2006 census, its population was 18, in 5 families.

References 

Populated places in Sepidan County